Rajya Sabha elections were held in 1978, to elect members of the Rajya Sabha, Indian Parliament's upper chamber.

Elections
Elections were held in 1978 to elect members from various states.
The list is incomplete.

Members elected
The following members are elected in the elections held in 1978. They are members for the term 1978-84 and retire in year 1978, except in case of the resignation or death before the term.

State - Member - Party

Bye-elections
The following bye elections were held in the year 1978.

State - Member - Party

 Uttar Pradesh - Shiva Nandan Singh - JAN (  ele  20/03/1978 term till 1980 )
 Madhya Pradesh - B Jamuna Devi - OTH (  ele  10/04/1978 term till 1980 )
 Maharashtra - Motiram Lahane - JAN (  ele  14/12/1978 term till 1980 )

References

1978 elections in India
1978